The 'Jamatias' are the one  of the main Tripuri clans of Tripura and the only such clan with its own Customary law in practice, which is called Jamatia Raida.

See also
 Tripuri people
 Kokborok
 Jamatia Hoda
 List of Scheduled Tribes in India
 Tripuri Kshatriya

References 

Scheduled Tribes of India
Ethnic groups in Tripura
West Tripura district
South Tripura district
Ethnic groups in Northeast India
Ethnic groups in South Asia